15th Malaysian Parliament may refer to:

 Members of the Dewan Negara, 15th Malaysian Parliament
 Members of the Dewan Rakyat, 15th Malaysian Parliament

Malaysian parliaments